Virginia Minnesota is a 2018 American comedy-drama film written and directed by Daniel Stine and starring Aurora Perrineau and Rachel Hendrix.

Cast
Aurora Perrineau as Addison
Rachel Hendrix as Lyle
Jessica Miesel as Brooke
Julia Keefe as Nakoda
Susan Walters as Suzette
Eyas Younis as Gabriel
Aaron Hill as Hunter
Daniel Stine as Hillman
Carl Palmer as Bill
Bradley Hasemeyer as Police Officer
Emma Reaves as Marcie
Harold Perrineau as the voice of Mister

Release
The film premiered at the Cinequest Film & Creativity Festival on March 2, 2018.

Reception
The film has a 71% rating on Rotten Tomatoes based on seven reviews.

Sheri Linden of The Hollywood Reporter gave the film a positive review and wrote, "The tonal shifts among mystery, folklore, melodrama and satire are neither smooth nor productively rough, and the narrative core remains unclear, lost amid the surfeit of disconnected moving parts."

Malik Adán of Film Threat also gave the film a positive review and wrote, "While this is surely the stuff of romcom boilerplate narratives, Virginia Minnesota prefers to wade into darker waters for the sake of more compelling, everyday drama."

References

External links
 
 

2010s English-language films